Athletics competitions at the 1938 Bolivarian Games
were held at the Estadio El Campín in Bogotá,
Colombia, in August 1938.

A detailed history of the early editions of the Bolivarian Games between 1938
and 1989 was published in a book written (in Spanish) by José Gamarra
Zorrilla, former president of the Bolivian Olympic Committee, and first
president (1976-1982) of ODESUR.  Gold medal winners from Ecuador were published by the Comité Olímpico Ecuatoriano.

A total of 27 events were contested, 23 by men and 4 by women.  Unusually, 
cross country events (individual and team) were part of the games.

Medal summary

Medal winners were published.

Men

Women

Medal table (unofficial)

References

Athletics at the Bolivarian Games
International athletics competitions hosted by Colombia
Bolivarian Games
1938 in Colombia
1938 Bolivarian Games